These are the results of the 1990 Ibero-American Championships in Athletics which took place from 14 to 16 September 1990 at Vila Olímpica in Manaus, Brazil.

Men's results

100 meters

Heat 1 – 16 September
Wind: +0.5 m/s

Heat 2 – 16 September
Wind: +0.5 m/s

Final – 16 September
Wind: +1.2 m/s

200 meters

Heat 1 – 15 September
Wind: -1.1 m/s

Heat 2 – 15 September
Wind: -1.1 m/s

Final – 15 September
Wind: +0.3 m/s

400 meters

Heat 1 – 14 September

Heat 2 – 14 September

Final Standings – 14 September
There was no proper 400m final.  Rather, the athletes were classified according to their times achieved in the heat.

800 meters
Final – 16 September

1500 meters
Final – 15 September

5000 meters
Final – 14 September

10,000 meters
Final – 16 September

3000 meters steeplechase
Final – 15 September

110 meters hurdles
Final – 14 September
Wind: -2.5 m/s

400 meters hurdles
Final – 15 September

High jump
Final – 15 September

Pole vault
Final – 16 September

Long jump
Final – 14 September

Triple jump
Final – 16 September

Shot put
Final – 15 September

Discus throw
Final – 14 September

Hammer throw
Final – 15 September

Javelin throw
Final – 16 September

Decathlon
Final – 14–15 September

20 kilometers walk
Final – 14 September

4x100 meters relay
Final – 15 September

4x400 meters relay
Final – 16 September

Women's results

100 meters
Final – 16 September
Wind: +0.6 m/s

200 meters

Heat 1 – 15 September
Wind: -1.2 m/s

Heat 2 – 15 September
Wind: -0.8 m/s

Final – 15 September
Wind: -0.1 m/s

400 meters

Heat 1 – 14 September

Heat 2 – 14 September

Final Standings – 14 September
There was no proper 400m final.  Rather, the athletes were classified according to their times achieved in the heat.

800 meters
Final – 16 September

1500 meters
Final – 15 September

3000 meters
Final – 16 September

10,000 meters
Final – 14 September

100 meters hurdles
Final – 14 September
Wind: -1.5 m/s

400 meters hurdles

Heat 1 – 15 September

Heat 2 – 15 September

Final – 15 September
There was no proper 400m hurdles final.  Rather, the athletes were classified according to their times achieved in the heat.

High jump
Final – 15 September

Long jump
Final – 15 September

Shot put
Final – 14 September

Discus throw
Final – 16 September

Javelin throw
Final – 15 September

Heptathlon
Final – 15 September

10,000 meters walk
Final – 15 September

4x100 meters relay
Final – 15 September

4x400 meters relay
Final – 16 September

References

Ibero-American Championships
Events at the Ibero-American Championships in Athletics